The 1990 Manitoba general election was held on September 11, 1990 to elect Members of the Legislative Assembly (MLAs) of the Province of Manitoba, Canada. It was won by the Progressive Conservative (PC) Party, which took 30 out of 57 seats.  The New Democratic Party finished second with 20, while the Liberal Party fell from 21 to 7.

Background
The 1990 election took place against the backdrop of the failed Meech Lake constitutional accord, which sought to clarify Quebec's position within Canada.  The accord, which was signed in 1988, required passage by the federal government and the ten provincial governments before June 23, 1990 to become law.  Although Manitoba Premier Howard Pawley had approved the accord in 1987, his government did not bring it before the legislature before their surprise defeat in 1988.

Pawley's replacement, PC leader Gary Filmon, was less inclined to support the deal, and requested that certain aspects be re-negotiated before his government would grant approval.  After some reluctance, Prime Minister Brian Mulroney allowed re-negotiations with all provincial Premiers, and convinced Filmon to introduce the accord to the Manitoba legislature shortly before the scheduled deadline.  Liberal leader Sharon Carstairs and NDP leader Gary Doer were also willing to support the revised deal.

Some members of Doer's caucus still opposed the accord, however.  When it was put before the legislature, NDP MLA Elijah Harper refused to grant unanimous leave for emergency debate, on the grounds that the deal did not recognize the position of aboriginals in Canada's constitutional framework.  Harper, the first indigenous member of the Manitoba legislature, was strongly supported by aboriginal leaders such as Phil Fontaine and Ovide Mercredi, and continued his protest in the legislature during the following weeks.  With assistance from former parliamentary clerk Gord Mackintosh, Harper was able to delay the legislative process until the accord simply could not be passed on time.  Harper became a national celebrity, and polls showed that most English-speaking Canadians supported his stand.

Ironically, Gary Filmon's Tories may have benefitted from Harper's actions.  Filmon was a long-time opponent of the accord, and was a fairly tepid supporter even after the renegotiated compromise was reached.  Subsequently, Filmon used the accord's failure to highlight differences between himself and Mulroney, who was becoming increasingly unpopular as Prime Minister.

Issues
Filmon's Progressive Conservatives made the fewest promises of any major party.  Their platform called for an end to abuse of the elderly in retirement homes, environmental initiatives, and low-cost economic development.  They proposed to cut the size of the Winnipeg City Council, and vowed not to raise taxes.

The Liberals focused on economic issues, promising a major investment in job training, research and development, and business support.  They also proposed to cut the Winnipeg Council, create government grants for tourism and adult education, and restore Tory cuts to health and other programs.

The NDP platform focused on workers' concerns, the environment, preventive health programs and housing. They supported an increase in the minimum wage, affirmative action programs, and laws which would make it expensive to shut down plants in Manitoba.  They also promised not to raise taxes, and opposed the sale of Manfor Ltd., a Crown corporation owned by the Province of Manitoba.

The small Progressive Party opposed affirmative action and the proposal to recognize in the Canadian constitution the Province of Quebec as a "distinct society" within Canada.

The campaign
A poll published in the Winnipeg Free Press indicated that the NDP were the most trusted party on economic issues, followed by the Tories.  The NDP were still damaged from their poor showing in the 1988 election, however, and began the campaign in third place.  The struggle for government initially appeared to be between the Liberals and Progressive Conservatives.

The Liberals ran a weak campaign, however, and were overtaken by the NDP after a strong performance from Gary Doer in the leaders' debate.  Doer further increased the NDP's standing in the last weeks of the campaign by highlighting the connections between Filmon and the Mulroney government on a number of issues.  The NDP's return to official opposition status was regarded as a major development after their near-collapse in 1988.

Results
The Tories continued their dominance in Manitoba's rural south, winning every seat in the region.  They also won 13 of 31 seats in Winnipeg and a few ridings to the city's immediate north, enough to provide the party with a majority of two.

The NDP won 11 seats in Winnipeg, and swept the province's north. They also won four seats in the mid-northern region, and retained Brandon East, their lone southern riding outside of Winnipeg. 

All seven seats retained by the Liberals were in Winnipeg, mostly in the centre and northwest of the city. With few exceptions, many of the centre-left voters who had voted Liberal in 1988 switched back to the NDP. 

1 "Before" refers to standings in the Legislature at dissolution, and not to the results of the previous election. These numbers therefore reflect changes in party standings as a result of by-elections and members crossing the floor.

Constituency results

|-
| style="background:whitesmoke;"|Arthur-Virden
||
|Jim Downey4,773
|
|Goldwyn Jones1,197
|
|Glen McKinnon2,085
|
|
||
|Jim Downey
|-
| style="background:whitesmoke;"|Assiniboia
||
|Linda McIntosh4,054
|
|Joan Johannson1,348
|
|Ed Mandrake2,730
|
|
||
|Ed Mandrake
|-
| style="background:whitesmoke;"|Brandon East
|
|Ron Arnst3,216
||
|Len Evans4,760
|
|Brenda Avlontis919
|
|
||
|Len Evans
|-
| style="background:whitesmoke;"|Brandon West
||
|James McCrae4,736
|
|Shari Decter Hirst2,374
|
|Abby Hampton1,428
|
|
||
|James McCrae
|-
| style="background:whitesmoke;"|Broadway
|
|Craig Johnson1,570
||
|Conrad Santos2,508
|
|Avis Gray2,400
|
|
||
|Avis Gray
|-
| style="background:whitesmoke;"|Burrows
|
|Chris Aune1,478
||
|Doug Martindale4,206
|
|William Chornopyski2,056
|
|
||
|William Chornopyski
|-
| style="background:whitesmoke;"|Charleswood
||
|Jim Ernst5,419
|
|Toni Vosters1,084
|
|Ken Brown2,912
|
|
||
|Jim Ernst
|-
| style="background:whitesmoke;"|Concordia
|
|Vic Rubiletz1,937
||
|Gary Doer4,588
|
|Gunter Grosskamper1,059
|
|Fred Cameron (WIP)168Guy Beaudry (Lbt)135
||
|Gary Doer
|-
| style="background:whitesmoke;"|Crescentwood
|
|Tom DeNardi3,278
|
|Neil Cohen2,184
||
|Jim Carr4,588
|
|
||
|Jim Carr
|-
| style="background:whitesmoke;"|Dauphin
|
|Martin Bidzinski3,424
||
|John Plohman4,802
|
|Peter Rampton1,608
|
|
||
|John Plohman
|-
| style="background:whitesmoke;"|Elmwood
|
|Vic Toews3,035
||
|Jim Maloway4,127
|
|Ed Price1,623
|
|
||
|Jim Maloway
|-
| style="background:whitesmoke;"|Emerson
||
|Jack Penner4,529
|
|Georgine Spooner1,055
|
|Réal Tétrault1,739
|
|
||
|Jack Penner
|-
| style="background:whitesmoke;"|Flin Flon
|
|Ron Black1,126
||
|Jerry Storie4,153
|
|Pascal Bighetty733
|
|
||
|Jerry Storie
|-
| style="background:whitesmoke;"|Fort Garry
||
|Rosemary Vodrey5,105
|
|Shirley Lord1,500
|
|Laurie Evans3,992
|
|Jan Mandseth (WIP)249
||
|Laurie Evans
|-
| style="background:whitesmoke;"|Gimli
||
|Ed Helwer5,118
|
|Tom Hughes2,666
|
|Darlene Skarito1,978
|
|
||
|Ed Helwer
|-
| style="background:whitesmoke;"|Gladstone
||
|Denis Rocan4,371
|
|Michael Newnan788
|
|Cordell Barker1,812
|
|Warren Murray (CoR)410
||
|Charlotte Oleson
|-
| style="background:whitesmoke;"|Inkster
|
|Raj Mehta1,416
|
|Ajit Deol2,637
||
|Kevin Lamoureux3,602
|
|Gordon Haddad (WIP)198
||
|Kevin Lamoureux
|-
| style="background:whitesmoke;"|Interlake
|
|Ed Trachuk2,533
||
|Clif Evans2,941
|
|Duncan Geisler1,781
|
|
||
|Bill Uruski
|-
| style="background:whitesmoke;"|Kildonan
|
|David Langtry3,694
||
|Dave Chomiak3,904
|
|Claudia Sarbit2,771
|
|Sidney Green (P)570
||
|Gulzar Singh Cheema
|-
| style="background:whitesmoke;"|Kirkfield Park
||
|Eric Stefanson5,813
|
|Shirley Manson1,035
|
|Jasper McKee3,430
|
|Frank Goldspink (Comm)25
||
|Gerrie Hammond
|-
| style="background:whitesmoke;"|Lac du Bonnet
||
|Darren Praznik5,162
|
|Leonard Kolton3,142
|
|Frank Thibedeau1,309
|
|
||
|Darren Praznik
|-
| style="background:whitesmoke;"|Lakeside
||
|Harry Enns3,719
|
|Eduard Hiebert1,248
|
|Delmer Nott1,936
|
|Irene Armishaw (CoR)486Dennis Rice (Lbt)95
||
|Harry Enns
|-
| style="background:whitesmoke;"|
La Verendrye
||
|Ben Sveinson3,731
|
|Ronald Fiola1,938
|
|Clair Noel2,718
|
|
||
|Helmut Pankratz
|-
| style="background:whitesmoke;"|Minnedosa
||
|Harold Gilleshammer4,294
|
|Sean Espey1,605
|
|Terry Drebit2,203
|
|
||
|Harold Gilleshammer
|-
| style="background:whitesmoke;"|Morris
||
|Clayton Manness5,353
|
|Gary Nelson721
|
|Bill Roth2,036
|
|Mark Edmondson (CoR)302
||
|Clayton Manness
|-
| style="background:whitesmoke;"|Niakwa
||
|Jack Reimer4,950
|
|Michael Simpson1,394
|
|Linda Asper4,301
|
|
||
|Herold Driedger
|-
| style="background:whitesmoke;"|Osborne
|
|Sondra Braid2,859
|
|Donald Bailey2,861
||
|Reg Alcock3,941
|
|Jim Weidman (Lbt)139
||
|Reg Alcock
|-
| style="background:whitesmoke;"|Pembina
||
|Donald Orchard5,497
|
|Bert Siemens652
|
|Marilyn Skubovius833
|
|
||
|Donald Orchard
|-
| style="background:whitesmoke;"|Point Douglas
|
|Calvin Pompana575
||
|George Hickes2,778
|
|Errol Lewis1,550
|
|William Hawryluk (Ind)108Roy Price (Ind)66
||
|new district
|-
| style="background:whitesmoke;"|Portage la Prairie
||
|Edward Connery4,276
|
|Arden Campbell1,092
|
|Darlene Hamm2,329
|
|Roy Lyall (CoR)243
||
|Edward Connery
|-
| style="background:whitesmoke;"|Radisson
|
|Mike Thompson2,692
||
|Marianne Cerilli4,055
|
|Allan Patterson1,925
|
|
||
|Allan Patterson
|-
| style="background:whitesmoke;"|Riel
||
|Gerry Ducharme3,756
|
|Bob Agnes2,041
|
|Ed Benjamin2,874
|
|
||
|Gerry Ducharme
|-
| style="background:whitesmoke;"|River East
||
|Bonnie Mitchelson4,963
|
|Rob DeGroot2,489
|
|Edna Mattson1,960
|
|
||
|Bonnie Mitchelson
|-
| style="background:whitesmoke;"|River Heights
|
|Shaun McCaffrey4,601
|
|Peter Sim1,190
||
|Sharon Carstairs5,467
|
|Clancy Smith (Lbt)138
||
|Sharon Carstairs
|-
| style="background:whitesmoke;"|Roblin-Russell
||
|Len Derkach4,382
|
|William Nicholson2,238
|
|Neil Stewart1,757
|
|
||
|Len Derkach
|-
| style="background:whitesmoke;"|Rossmere
||
|Harold Neufeld3,893
|
|Maxine Hamilton2,725
|
|Terry Duguid2,416
|
|Kathrina Cameron (WIP)163
||
|Harold Neufeld
|-
| style="background:whitesmoke;"|Rupertsland
|
|Hugh Wynne804
||
|Elijah Harper3,798
|
|George Kernaghan307
|
|
||
|Elijah Harper
|-
| style="background:whitesmoke;"|St. Boniface
|
|Henri Marcoux1,921
|
|Robert Gooding2,046
||
|Neil Gaudry4,928
|
|
||
|Neil Gaudry
|-
| style="background:whitesmoke;"|St. James
|
|Joanne Thibault2,719
|
|Len Sawatsky2,586
||
|Paul Edwards3,014
|
|Charles Lamont (P)148Fred Debrecen (CoR)122
||
|Paul Edwards
|-
| style="background:whitesmoke;"|St. Johns
|
|Lynn Filbert1,502
||
|Judy Wasylycia-Leis4,392
|
|Mark Minenko2,414
|
|
||
|Judy Wasylycia-Leis
|-
| style="background:whitesmoke;"|St. Norbert
||
|Marcel Laurendeau4,502
|
|Andrew Sawatsky1,011
|
|John Angus4,385
|
|
||
|John Angus
|-
| style="background:whitesmoke;"|St. Vital
||
|Shirley Render3,361
|
|Kathleen McCallum2,368
|
|Bob Rose3,243
|
|Doug Browning (WIP)288
||
|Bob Rose
|-
| style="background:whitesmoke;"|Ste. Rose
||
|Glen Cummings3,646
|
|Sam Voisey1,540
|
|Ivan Traill1,882
|
|
||
|Glen Cummings
|-
| style="background:whitesmoke;"|Seine River
||
|Louise Dacquay4,465
|
|Keith Kendall1,792
|
|Herold Driedger4,418
|
|Lyle Cruickshank (WIP)289
||
|new district
|-
| style="background:whitesmoke;"|Selkirk
|
|Russ Farrell3,467
||
|Greg Dewar3,735
|
|Gwen Charles3,009
|
|
||
|Gwen Charles
|-
| style="background:whitesmoke;"|Springfield
||
|Glen Findlay5,146
|
|Deborah Barron-McNabb3,374
|
|Bob Strong1,958
|
|
||
|Glen Findlay
|-
| style="background:whitesmoke;"|Steinbach
||
|Albert Driedger5,540
|
|Marcel Lagassé483
|
|Cornelius Goertzen1,171
|
|Ken McAllister (Lbt)130
||
|Albert Driedger
|-
| style="background:whitesmoke;"|Sturgeon Creek
||
|Gerry McAlpine4,676
|
|Andrew Swan1,471
|
|Iva Yeo3,907
|
|
||
|Iva Yeo
|-
| style="background:whitesmoke;"|Swan River
|
|Park Burrell3,639
||
|Rosann Wowchuk3,872
|
|June Connolly-Peyton963
|
|
||
|Park Burrell
|-
| style="background:whitesmoke;"|The Maples
|
|Norman Isler2,684
|
|Tony Valeri2,260
||
|Gulzar Singh Cheema3,273
|
|
||
|new district
|-
| style="background:whitesmoke;"|The Pas
|
|Alfred McDonald3,247
||
|Oscar Lathlin3,390
|
|David Merasty1,005
|
|
||
|Harry Harapiak
|-
| style="background:whitesmoke;"|Thompson
|
|Loretta Clarke2,043
||
|Steve Ashton4,099
|
|Don McIvor698
|
|
||
|Steve Ashton
|-
| style="background:whitesmoke;"|Transcona
|
|Ray Hargreaves1,732
||
|Daryl Reid4,363
|
|Richard Kozak2,554
|
|Thomas Bunn (P)168
||
|Richard Kozak
|-
| style="background:whitesmoke;"|Turtle Mountain
||
|Bob Rose4,702
|
|Robert Smith1,047
|
|Doug Collins2,091
|
|Rod Stephenson (I)173
||
|Denis Rocan
|-
| style="background:whitesmoke;"|Tuxedo
||
|Gary Filmon7,861
|
|Rosemary Ahoff926
|
|Campbell Wright3,281
|
|
||
|Gary Filmon
|-
| style="background:whitesmoke;"|Wellington
|
|Clyde Perry1,534
||
|Becky Barrett3,484
|
|Ernie Gilroy2,324
|
|Neil Schipper (P)128Walter Diawol (I)68Stephen Keki (I)35
||
|new district
|-
| style="background:whitesmoke;"|Wolseley
|
|Fay Campbell1,503
||
|Jean Friesen3,265
|
|Harold Taylor2520
|
|Gordon Pratt (P)149
||
|Harold Taylor
|}

Post-election changes

|-
| style="background:whitesmoke;"|CrescentwoodSeptember 15, 1992
|
|Jenny Hillard1,995
|
|Tim Sale2,256
||
|Avis Gray2,697
|
|Sidney Green (P)900Ken Carver (R)97Dennis Rice (Lbt)19
||
|Jim Carr
|-
| style="background:whitesmoke;"|Portage la PrairieSeptember 15, 1992
||
|Brian Pallister3,226
|
|Ralph Jackson648
|
|Helen Christoffersen1,995
|
|Fred Debrecen (R)388
||
|Edward Connery
|-
| style="background:whitesmoke;"|RupertslandSeptember 21, 1993
|
|Eric Kennedy614
||
|Eric Robinson1,697
|
|George Munroe1,023
|
|
||
|Elijah Harper
|-
| style="background:whitesmoke;"|RossmereSeptember 21, 1993
|
|Ed Martens2,159
||
|Harry Schellenberg2,990
|
|Sherry Wiebe1,590
|
|Cynthia Cooke (Ind)186
||
|Harold Neufeld
|-
| style="background:whitesmoke;"|The MaplesSeptember 21, 1993
|
|David Langtry1,362
|
|Norma Walker2,138
||
|Gary Kowalski3,619
|
|
||
|Gulzar Singh Cheema
|-
| style="background:whitesmoke;"|OsborneSeptember 21, 1993
|
|Roger Young1,496
|
|Irene Haigh2,420
||
|Norma McCormick2,966
|
|
||
|Reg Alcock
|-
| style="background:whitesmoke;"|St. JohnsSeptember 21, 1993
|
|June Robertson465
||
|Gord Mackintosh3,232
|
|Naty Yankech878
|
|Neil Schipper (P)241
||
|Judy Wasylycia-Leis
|-
|}

Two further vacancies, in Flin Flon (resignation of Jerry Storie, July 20, 1994) and River Heights (Sharon Carstairs appointed to the Senate of Canada, September 15, 1994), were not filled in by-elections before the 1995 election.

See also
 List of Manitoba political parties
 

1990 elections in Canada
1990
1990 in Manitoba
September 1990 events in Canada